Dorel Mutică (born 14 March 1973) is a Romanian former professional footballer and currently a manager. He played mainly as a defender for teams such as: UTA Arad, Rapid București, CSM Reșița, Steaua București or Lombard Pápa, among others. After retirement Mutică started his career as a football manager, occupying this position at fourth tier sides Frontiera Curtici and Progresul Pecica, both from Arad County, where Mutică settled.

His nickname, Mutamba, was given to him by Iulian Chiriță, after Congolese footballer Mutamba Kabongo.

International career
Mutică played for Romania U21 since he was a second division player at UTA Arad, then he made his debut for the first representative of Romania on 2 February 2000 in a friendly match against Latvia.

Personal life
Dorel Mutică is married to his wife, Mirela, for over 15 years and they have a son together, named Denis Alexandru.

Honours

Player
 Rapid București
 Divizia A: Winner 1998–99
 Cupa României: Runner-up 1994–95
 Supercupa României: Winner 1999; Runner-up 1998

References

External links
 
 
 

1973 births
Living people
People from Gorj County
Romanian footballers
Romania under-21 international footballers
Romania international footballers
Association football defenders
Association football midfielders
Liga I players
Liga II players
FC UTA Arad players
FC Rapid București players
FC Brașov (1936) players
CSM Reșița players
FC Steaua București players
FC U Craiova 1948 players
CS Național Sebiș players
Nemzeti Bajnokság I players
Lombard-Pápa TFC footballers
Romanian expatriate footballers
Romanian expatriate sportspeople in Hungary
Expatriate footballers in Hungary
Romanian football managers